Prana Snehitha (Kannada: ಪ್ರಾಣ ಸ್ನೇಹಿತ) is a 1993 Indian Kannada film, directed by Bhargav and produced by S. D. Ankalagi, B. H. Chandannavar and M. G. Hublikar. The film stars Shankar Nag, Ramakrishna, Bhavya and Tara in the lead roles. The film has musical score by M. Ranga Rao.

Cast

Shankar Nag as Ram
Ramakrishna as Shyam
Bhavya
Tara
Sudheer
Mukhyamantri Chandru
Ramesh Bhat
Dinesh
Kunigal Nagabhushan as Vaikuntha
B. K. Shankar
Mysore Lokesh
Shani Mahadevappa
Chandannavara
Rajanand
Sadashiva Brahmavar
Umesh
Sathyabhama
Sumathi
Sumathishree
Master B. K. Sunil
Master Krishnamurthy
Master Prashanth
Baby Nagashilpa
Baby Savitha
Phani Ramachandra
Srishaila
Saikumar
Lamani
Kunigal Ramanath
H. T. Urs
Bemel Somanna
Chikkanna
Shankar Bhat
Shivaprakash

References

External links
 

1993 films
1990s Kannada-language films
Films scored by M. Ranga Rao
Films directed by H. R. Bhargava